Afterworld may refer to:

 Afterworld (web series), a 2007 computer-animated American science fiction series
 Afterworld, a collectible card game from Panini Games
 "Afterworld", a song on Tiger Army's 2007 album Music from Regions Beyond
 "Afterworld" (song), a 2010 song by the alternative metal band CKY

See also 
 Afterlife (disambiguation)